Zoltán Molnár (born 4 April 1961) is a Hungarian rower. He competed in the men's quadruple sculls event at the 1988 Summer Olympics. He coaches his son, Bendegúz Pétervári-Molnár, who is also an Olympic rower. The sprint canoeist Pál Pétervári is his brother-in-law.

References

External links
 

1961 births
Living people
Hungarian male rowers
Olympic rowers of Hungary
Rowers at the 1988 Summer Olympics
Rowers from Budapest